is a 2016 Japanese crime comedy-drama film directed by Kazuya Shiraishi and written by Junya Ikegami. It was released in Japan by Toei and Nikkatsu on June 25, 2016.

Plot

Cast
Gō Ayano as Yoichi Moroboshi

Yukio Ueno
Haruna Yabuki

Tomoya Nakamura
Katsuya
Ayumu Saitō
Munetaka Aoki

Pierre Taki
Nakamura Shidō II
Go Jibiki

Reception
As of July 10, 2016, the film had grossed  in Japan.

James Hadfield of The Japan Times gave the film two and a half stars out of five, saying the film "is a shade off" and that "the director has attempted to fashion a blackly comic caper from a story that would probably have benefitted from a grittier approach."

References

External links
 

2010s Japanese films
Toei Company films
Nikkatsu films
Japanese crime comedy-drama films
2010s crime comedy-drama films
Films directed by Kazuya Shiraishi
2016 comedy films
2016 drama films
2010s Japanese-language films